Kāneohe is a census-designated place (CDP) included in the City and County of Honolulu and in Hawaii state District of Koolaupoko on the island of Oahu. In the Hawaiian language, kāne ohe means "bamboo man". According to an ancient Hawaiian story, a local woman compared her husband's cruelty to the sharp edge of cutting bamboo; thus the place was named Kāneohe or "bamboo man". The population was 37,430 at the 2020 census. Kāneohe is the largest of several communities along Kāneohe Bay and one of the two largest residential communities on the windward side of Oahu (the other is Kailua). The town's commercial center is spread mostly along Kamehameha Highway.

From ancient times, Kāneohe was important as an agricultural area, owing to an abundance of rainfall. Today, it is mostly a residential community, with very little agriculture in evidence. The only commercial crop of any consequence in the area is banana.

Features of note are Hoomaluhia Botanical Garden and the Hawaii National Veterans Cemetery. Access to Kāneohe Bay is mainly from the public pier and boat ramp at nearby Heeia Kea. Access to Coconut Island (restricted) is from the state pier off Lilipuna Road. Marine Corps Base Hawaii lies across the south end of Kāneohe Bay from the central Kāneohe, although the town stretches along Kāneohe Bay Drive to the base perimeter.

There are three golf courses in Kāneohe: Pali Golf Course (public), Koolau Golf Club (privately owned but open to the public), and Bayview Golf Park (privately owned but open to the public).

History 
Kāneʻohe was home to the early rulers of the Hawaiian Kingdom and consisted of 30 royal fishponds. It was originally an agricultural area for the growing of taro and sweet potatoes.

Geography 
Kāneʻohe is located at  (21.409200, -157.799084). Nearby towns include Kailua to the east, reached either by Kāneohe Bay Drive (State Rte. 630) or Kamehameha Highway (State Rte. 83), the former also providing a connection to Marine Corps Base Hawaii, and the latter connecting to Interstate H-3 and (at Castle Junction) Pali Highway (State Rte. 61) to Honolulu. Likelike Highway (State Rte. 63) runs southwest over and through the Koolau to Honolulu. Likelike provides connections to Kahekili Highway and Heeia, and H-3 southbound to Hālawa. The first three exits on the windward side of Interstate H-3 east (north) bound access Kāneohe. Kamehameha Highway runs northward from Kāneohe (State Rte. 830) through Heeia to Heeia Kea.

The total area is 22.80% water, consisting of a portion of Kāneohe Bay included in the census tract.

Climate
Kaneohe has a tropical steppe climate.

Demographics 

As of the 2000 Census, there were 34,970 people, 10,976 households, and 8,682 families residing in Kāneohe. The racial makeup of the CDP was 20.49% White, 0.81% Black, 0.20% Native American, 38.48% Asian, 11.44% Pacific Islander, 0.68% from other races, and 27.90% from two or more races. 7.21% of the population were Hispanic or Latino of any race.

Of the 10,976 households 32.7% had children under the age of 18 living with them, 60.4% were married couples living together, 13.7% had a female householder with no husband present, and 20.9% were non-families. 15.4% of households were one person and 6.5% had someone living alone who was 65 or older. The average household size was 3.14 and the average family size was 3.48.

The age distribution was 24.6% under the age of 18, 8.2% from 18 to 24, 29.0% from 25 to 44, 23.4% from 45 to 64, and 14.7% 65 or older. The median age was 38 years. For every 100 females, there were 96.1 males. For every 100 females age 18 and over, there were 93.2 males.

The median household income was in Kāneohe in 2000 was $66,006, and the median family income was $71,316. Males had a median income of $40,389 versus $31,504 for females. The per capita income for the CDP was $23,476. 6.1% of the population and 4.4% of families were below the poverty line. Out of the total population, 7.3% of those under the age of 18 and 4.2% of those 65 and older were living below the poverty line.

Government and infrastructure
The Honolulu Police Department operates the Kaneohe Substation in Kaneohe.

Education
The Hawaii Department of Education operates the public schools.

Elementary schools in Kaneohe CDP include Heʻeia, Kāneʻohe, Kapunahala, Reverend Benjamin Parker, and Pūʻōhala. James B. Castle High School is in the CDP.

Schools with Kaneohe postal addresses but outside the CDP include Governor Samuel Wilder King Intermediate School in Heeia CDP, ʻĀhuimanu Elementary School adjacent to, but not in, Ahuimanu CDP, Kahalu'u Elementary School in Kahalu'u CDP, and Waiāhole Elementary School in Waikane.

There is the Hakipuʻu Learning Center, a public charter school for grades 7 through 12.

The Roman Catholic Diocese of Honolulu operates St. Ann Catholic School, K-8, in Heeia CDP but with a Kaneohe address.

Also within the boundaries of Kaneohe CDP are these private schools: Huakailani School for Girls (K-8), Koʻolau Baptist Academy, St Mark Lutheran School, and Windward Nazarene Academy.

Windward Community College, part of the state college system, is on the south side of central Kāneohe. Hawaii Pacific University operates its Windward Hawaiʻi Loa campus on Kamehameha Highway near Castle Junction.

Notable people
 Kimee Balmilero, actress
 Bryan Clay, decathlete, Olympic Gold Medalist
 Aloha Dalire, kumu hula and hula dancer, first Miss Aloha Hula winner (1971)
 Alika DeRego, volleyball player, U.S. Open national champion
 Carlos Diaz, former Major League Baseball relief pitcher who played for the Atlanta Braves, New York Mets, and Los Angeles Dodgers
Caitlin Doughty, mortician, author, and YouTube personality
 Blane Gaison, former National Football League player
 Ann Harada, actress
 Don Ho, singer and entertainer
Lisa Kitagawa, member of the Hawaii House of Representatives
 Colleen Meyer, Hawaii state legislator and businesswoman
 Janel Parrish, actress and singer

References

External links

Census-designated places in Honolulu County, Hawaii
Populated places on Oahu
Populated coastal places in Hawaii

mg:Honolulu, Hawaii